Killemlagh Church is a ruined 12th-century church in County Kerry in the southwest of Ireland.

Name and location

Killemlagh, or Cill Imleach, means "church (cill) on marginal land (imleach)", or "church on border land".
John O'Hanlon (1821–1905) states that the name is due to the church lying beside the sea.
The church gives its name to the parish of Killemlagh in the Barony of Iveragh, County Kerry.
The graveyard is locally known as Glen graveyard, after the Glen parish church which adjoins the older Killemlagh Church.
It may be so-named because it is situated within a glen between Knocknaskereighta Mountain to the northeast and Canuig Mountain to the southwest.

The church is on the Skellig Ring drive between Portmagee and Ballinskelligs, looking over St. Finian's Bay.
From the church one can see the Skellig Islands.
The megalithic stone structure called the "Pagan's Grave" is nearby.
The site is said to be that of the monastery of Finnian of Clonard.
To the west of the old church, St. Finin's Well is situated by the sea shore.

Structure

Killemlagh Church was built in the late 12th century.
The style is Romanesque.
Until the mid-17th century the church was in good condition, but it has since lost its roof.
A new chapel was attached to the original church, which by then was ruined, in the 19th century.
The new parish church is now also roofless.
According to O'Hanlon, writing in 1875,

The antiquary P.J. Lynch described the church in 1909.
Although the style was generally typical of a church of the 12th century, the shallower pitch of the roof led him to think it might be of later construction. 
The stone of the walls are not large, and the green stone of the district was used for the door and window dressings.
The heads of the windows are semi-circular.
The original doorway was in the west end, but this had been filled in.
In 1909 the doorway was in the south side, and the dressings had either been removed or the opening was relatively recent and never had dressings.

Notes

Sources

 pp. 42–63 (22 pages)

12th-century churches in Ireland
Roman Catholic churches in County Kerry